A rolling blackout, also referred to as rota or rotational load shedding, rota disconnection, feeder rotation, or a rotating outage, is an intentionally engineered electrical power shutdown in which electricity delivery is stopped for non-overlapping periods of time over different parts of the distribution region. Rolling blackouts are a last-resort measure used by an electric utility company to avoid a total blackout of the power system.

Rolling blackouts are a measure of demand response if the demand for electricity exceeds the power supply capability of the network. Rolling blackouts may be localised to a specific part of the electricity network, or they may be more widespread and affect entire countries and continents. Rolling blackouts generally result from two causes: insufficient generation capacity or inadequate transmission infrastructure to deliver power to where it is needed.

Rolling blackouts are also used as a response strategy to cope with reduced output beyond reserve capacity from power stations taken offline unexpectedly.

In developing countries
Rolling blackouts are a common or even a normal daily event in many developing countries, where electricity generation capacity is underfunded or infrastructure is poorly managed.  In well managed under-capacity systems blackouts are planned and schedules are published in advance to allow people to work around them. In poorly managed systems they happen without warning, typically whenever the transmission frequency falls below the 'safe' limit.

These have wide-ranging impacts, and can effect the expectations of communities—for example—in Ghana dumsor describes the widespread expectations for intermittent unexpected power outages due to rolling blackouts.

South Africa 

Since 2007, South Africa has experienced multiple periods of rolling blackouts which are locally referred to as load shedding by the state-owned energy company Eskom. This was initially caused by the country's demand for electricity outstripping supply, and as time progressed, later exacerbated by ageing power infrastructure, poor maintenance, and the slow completion of new power stations. This has caused significantly severe damage to the South African economy and has played a large part in limiting the country's economic growth.

Ukraine 

During 2022 invasion of Ukraine, Russia conducted multiple attacks on energy infrastructure of Ukraine. On October 23 rolling blackouts were introduced in Kyiv City and Kyiv region. Rolling blackouts were introduced in all Ukrainian regions on October 25.

In developed countries 
Rolling blackouts in developed countries sometimes occur due to economic forces at the expense of system reliability (such as in the 2000–01 California energy crisis), or during natural disasters such as heat waves. In California rolling blackouts occurred in June 2000 and in January, March and May 2001. The 2021 Texas power crisis involved rolling blackouts caused by the February 13–17, 2021 North American winter storm and lack of winterization. The Late December 2022 North American winter storm resulted in rolling blackouts in parts of the eastern US.

2011 Tōhoku earthquake
After the 2011 Tōhoku earthquake and tsunami, Tokyo Electric Power Company implemented rolling blackouts. Its service area were divided to five blocks and blackouts were implemented from 6:20 to 22:00. The schedule from 15 to 18 March 2011 was as follows:

Effects 
Intermittent access to electricity causes major economic problems for businesses, which incur costs in the form of lost resources, reduced patronage, or curtailed production if electrical equipment—for example refrigeration, lighting, or machinery—abruptly stops working. Businesses in areas that are subject to regular blackouts may invest in backup power generation to avoid these costs, but power backup is itself a cost because generators must be purchased and maintained and fuel must be regularly replenished.

Scheduling 
When blackouts are scheduled in advance, they are easier to work around.

The speed at which blackouts roll may be adjusted so that no blackout lasts longer than a certain limit. For instance, in Italy, the PESSE (Piano di Emergenza per la Sicurezza del Sistema Electrico, Emergency plan for national grid safety) does not permit a controlled blackout longer than 90 minutes. In Canada, blackouts have been rolled so that no area had to spend more than one hour without power.

Causes 
In some countries, generating capacity is chronically below demand. Assorted factors may prevent adequate investment in generation. Alternately, generating capacity may temporarily decrease below demand due to power station outages or loss of renewable capacity due to the wind dropping or the sun shining less. Natural disasters can also abruptly reduce supply by damaging power plants. A lack of fuel makes some types of power plant useless. Industrial accidents and poor maintenance can also take generation capacity offline. Conflict can disrupt fuel supply, as well as damage or destroy generating and delivery infrastructure.

In electricity grids where power generators are paid a flexible market rate, power suppliers sometimes deliberately keep the generating capacity too low, or fake accidents that take capacity offline, to jack up prices.

Demand spikes can also cause blackouts. Unusually hot or cold weather can cause demand spikes.

References

Power outages